In enzymology, a 3alpha-hydroxyglycyrrhetinate dehydrogenase is an enzyme that catalyzes the chemical reaction

3alpha-hydroxyglycyrrhetinate + NADP+  3-oxoglycyrrhetinate + NADPH + H+

Thus, the two substrates of this enzyme are 3alpha-hydroxyglycyrrhetinate and NADP+, whereas its 3 products are 3-oxoglycyrrhetinate, NADPH, and H+.

This enzyme belongs to the family of oxidoreductases, specifically those acting on the CH-OH group of donor with NAD+ or NADP+ as acceptor. The systematic name of this enzyme class is 3alpha-hydroxyglycyrrhetinate:NADP+ 3-oxidoreductase.

References

 

EC 1.1.1
NADPH-dependent enzymes
Enzymes of unknown structure